The Dantzig Prize is given every 3 years  to one or more individuals for research which, by virtue of its originality, breadth, and depth, has a major impact on the field of mathematical programming. It is named in honor of George B. Dantzig and is awarded jointly by the Society for Industrial and Applied Mathematics (SIAM) and the Mathematical Optimization Society (MOS). The prize fund was established in 1979, and the prize first awarded in 1982.

Recipients
The recipients of the Dantzig Prize are:

1982: Michael J.D. Powell, R. Tyrell Rockafellar
1985: Ellis Johnson, Manfred Padberg
1988: Michael J. Todd
1991: Martin Grotschel, Arkady S. Nemirovskii
1994: Claude Lemarechal, Roger J.B. Wets
1997: Roger Fletcher, Stephen M. Robinson
2000: Yurii Nesterov
2003: Jong-Shi Pang, Alexander Schrijver
2006: Eva Tardos
2009: Gérard Cornuéjols
2012: Jorge Nocedal, Laurence Wolsey
2015: Dimitri P. Bertsekas
2018: Andrzej Piotr Ruszczyński, Alexander Shapiro
2021: Hedy Attouch, Michel Goemans

See also

 List of mathematics awards

References

Awards of the Society for Industrial and Applied Mathematics